Communauté d'agglomération Vienne Condrieu, also: Vienne Condrieu Agglomération, is an intercommunal structure, centred on the city of Vienne. It is located in the Isère and Rhône departments, in the Auvergne-Rhône-Alpes region, eastern France. It was created in January 2017. Its seat is in Vienne. Its area is 419.0 km2. Its population was 90,357 in 2018, of which 29,583 in Vienne proper.

Composition
The communauté d'agglomération consists of the following 30 communes, of which 12 in the Rhône department:

Ampuis
Chasse-sur-Rhône
Chonas-l'Amballan
Chuzelles
Condrieu
Les Côtes-d'Arey
Échalas
Estrablin
Eyzin-Pinet
Les Haies
Jardin
Loire-sur-Rhône
Longes
Luzinay
Meyssiez
Moidieu-Détourbe
Pont-Évêque
Reventin-Vaugris
Saint-Cyr-sur-le-Rhône
Sainte-Colombe
Saint-Romain-en-Gal
Saint-Romain-en-Gier
Saint-Sorlin-de-Vienne
Septème
Serpaize
Seyssuel
Trèves
Tupin-et-Semons
Vienne
Villette-de-Vienne

References

Vienne Condrieu
Vienne Condrieu
Vienne Condrieu